Kansas Glacier is a steep glacier,  long, draining northeast from Stanford Plateau, Antarctica, to enter Reedy Glacier just north of Blubaugh Nunatak. It was mapped by the United States Geological Survey from surveys and U.S. Navy air photos, 1960–64, and was named by the Advisory Committee on Antarctic Names for the University of Kansas, Lawrence, Kansas, which has sent a number of research personnel to Antarctica.

See also
Lowe Bluff, a high, ice-covered bluff between the head of Kansas Glacier and Alaska Canyon
Mount O'Neil

References

External links

Glaciers of Marie Byrd Land